Cleonymus is a genus of wasps in the family Pteromalidae.

Species 
 Cleonymus agrili (Rohwer, 1919)
 Cleonymus albomaculatus Hedqvist, 1960
 Cleonymus amabilis (Cockerell, 1926)
 Cleonymus angustatus (Masi, 1927)
 Cleonymus apicalis Förster, 1841
 Cleonymus balcanicus Boucek, 1972
 Cleonymus brevis Boucek, 1972
 Cleonymus californicus (Crawford, 1916)
 Cleonymus canariensis Hedqvist, 1983
 Cleonymus ceratinae Kamijo, 1996
 Cleonymus collaris Spinola, 1851
 Cleonymus cyaneus Förster, 1841
 Cleonymus dentatifemur (Girault, 1926)
 Cleonymus elongatus Förster, 1841
 Cleonymus eucalifornicus Özdikmen, 2011
 Cleonymus eximius Förster, 1841
 Cleonymus grandiceps Xiao & Huang, 2001
 Cleonymus indicus Sureshan, 2015
 Cleonymus kamijoi Sureshan & Balan, 2013
 Cleonymus keralicus Narendran & Rajmohana, 2008
 Cleonymus laticinctus (Girault, 1926)
 Cleonymus laticornis Walker, 1837
 Cleonymus longinervus Kamijo, 1983
 Cleonymus magnificus (Ashmead, 1888)
 Cleonymus magnus Boucek, 1988
 Cleonymus malaicus Narendran & Mini, 1997
 Cleonymus nigriclavus Girault, 1917
 Cleonymus obscurus Walker, 1837
 Cleonymus pentlandi (Girault, 1922)
 Cleonymus pini Yang, 1996
 Cleonymus regalis (Dodd, 1924)
 Cleonymus reticulatus (Howard, 1897)
 Cleonymus rufiscapus (Girault, 1925)
 Cleonymus ryukyuensis Kamijo, 1996
 Cleonymus serrulatus Kamijo, 1996
 Cleonymus silvifilia (Girault, 1927)
 Cleonymus texanus (Crawford, 1916)
 Cleonymus togashii Kamijo, 1996
 Cleonymus trifasciatipennis (Girault, 1915)
 Cleonymus ulmi Yang, 1996
 Cleonymus unfasciatipennis (Girault, 1915)
 Cleonymus unnotipennis (Girault, 1915)
 Cleonymus viridicyaneus (Risbec, 1952)
 Cleonymus viridinitens Förster, 1841

References

External links 
 

Pteromalidae
Hymenoptera genera